Harold Horton (c. 1939) is a former American football player and coach. He served as the head football coach at the University of Central Arkansas (UCA) from 1982 to 1989, compiling a record of 74–12–5 and winning NAIA Division I Football National Championships, in 1984 and 1985. His teams also won seven straight Arkansas Intercollegiate Conference (AIC) championships from 1983 to 1989.

Horton played college football at the University of Arkansas from 1959 to 1961 under head Frank Broyles, after graduating from DeWitt High School in DeWitt, Arkansas. He was part of Razorbacks teams that won or shared Southwest Conference (SWC) championships in each of his three seasons, as well as winning the 1960 Gator Bowl.

He was the head football coach at Bald Knob High School in Bald Knob, Arkansas. After three successful seasons he was hired as the head football coach at Forrest City High School in Forrest City, Arkansas before returning to Arkansas in 1968 as an assistant coach under Broyles until be took the head coaching job at UCA in 1982.

Horton left UCA after the 1989 season and returned to the University of Arkansas in 1990 as an administrator for the athletics department and football operations. He was replaced as head football coach at UCA by his assistant, Mike Isom. From 2001 to 2012, he served as President of the Razorback Foundation.

Horton is the father of Air Force Academy running backs coach and special teams coordinator Tim Horton, who also played for Arkansas as a wide receiver from 1986 to 1989, winning two SWC championships of his own in 1988 and 1989.

Head coaching record

College

References

Year of birth missing (living people)
Living people
American football defensive backs
Arkansas Razorbacks football coaches
Arkansas Razorbacks football players
Central Arkansas Bears football coaches
High school football coaches in Arkansas
People from DeWitt, Arkansas
Coaches of American football from Arkansas
Players of American football from Arkansas